Eichner is a surname. Notable people with the surname include:

Adelheid Maria Eichner (1762–1787), German composer
Alfred S. Eichner (1937–1988), American economist
Billy Eichner (born 1978), American comedian and actor
Clare Eichner (born 1969), American long-distance runner
Christian Eichner (born 1982), German football player
Ernst Eichner (1740-1777), German bassoonist and composer
Florian Eichner (born 1985), German rower
Henry M. Eichner (1909–1971), American non-fiction writer
Ian Bruce Eichner (born 1945), American real estate developer
Kenneth Eichner (born 1954), American lawyer
Philip K. Eichner, American priest
Sylvia Eichner (born 1957), German swimmer
German toponymic surnames